Group Captain George Nigel "Geordie" Douglas-Hamilton, 10th Earl of Selkirk,  (4 January 1906 – 24 November 1994) was a British nobleman and Conservative politician.

Early life
Born at Merly, Wimborne, Dorset, he was the second son of Nina Mary Benita, youngest daughter of Major R. Poore, Salisbury, and the 13th Duke of Hamilton and Brandon. He was educated at Eton College, Balliol College, Oxford, the University of Edinburgh (LLB) and at the University of Bonn, Vienna University and the Sorbonne. He was admitted to the Faculty of Advocates in 1935, taking silk in 1959.

He played cricket for Wiltshire in the 1927 Minor Counties Championship.

He was a member of Edinburgh Town Council from 1935 to 1940 and served as a Commissioner of General Board of Control (Scotland) from 1936 to 1939 and as a Commissioner for Special Areas in Scotland 1937–39. He commanded No. 603 (City of Edinburgh) Squadron in the Royal Auxiliary Air Force 1934–38.

Second World War
With the outbreak of the Second World War Douglas-Hamilton joined the Royal Air Force. He served as Fighter Command's chief intelligence officer and the personal assistant to Air Chief Marshal Sir Hugh Dowding. Douglas-Hamilton was also involved in countering the German task force operating near Ceylon.

Douglas-Hamilton was twice Mentioned in Despatches, awarded the Air Force Cross in 1938, and appointed an Officer of the Order of the British Empire in 1941.

He succeeded as the 12th Earl of Selkirk on the death of his father in 1940, under the terms of a special remainder, his elder brother becoming the 14th Duke of Hamilton.

Post-war activity
From 1946 to 1950, Selkirk served as the president of the Cockburn Association, an influential conservationist and civic amenity body.

On 6 August 1947, he married Audrey Sale-Barker, an alpine skiing champion and prominent aviator.

In 1945 he was elected as a Scottish representative peer, giving him a seat in the House of Lords which he held until 1963. He served as a Lord in Waiting to King George VI (1951–1952) and to Queen Elizabeth II (1952–1953). He held Ministerial office in Conservative governments, serving as Paymaster-General from November 1953 to December 1955, as Chancellor of the Duchy of Lancaster from December 1955 to January 1957, and as First Lord of the Admiralty from January 1957 to October 1959.

In 1955 Selkirk was appointed a Privy Counsellor, in 1959 as a Knight Grand Cross of the Order of St Michael and St George, and in 1963 as a Knight Grand Cross of the Order of the British Empire. In 1976 he became a Knight of the Order of the Thistle, the highest Scottish honour. 

He also held the office of Deputy Keeper of Holyroodhouse from 1937 until his death, the Duke of Hamilton being hereditary Keeper. He was made a Freeman of Hamilton, Scotland in 1938.  He was also an Honorary Chief of the Saulteaux Indians, 1967, and an Honorary Citizen of the City of Winnipeg and of the town of Selkirk, Manitoba.

Singapore
From 1959 to 1963, Selkirk was High Commissioner of the United Kingdom to Singapore and Commissioner General for South-East Asia. He was also the British Representative to Southeast Asia Treaty Organization from 1960 to 1963. While in Singapore, Selkirk was also the British representative and Chairman of the Internal Security Council, a tripartite committee responsible for Singapore's internal security from 1959 to 1963.

See also
Douglas Douglas-Hamilton, 14th Duke of Hamilton
Lord Malcolm Douglas-Hamilton
Lord David Douglas-Hamilton

References

External links

 
 

 

1906 births
1994 deaths
Military personnel from Dorset
20th-century British lawyers
Alumni of Balliol College, Oxford
Alumni of the University of Edinburgh
Chancellors of the Duchy of Lancaster
Conservative Party (UK) Baronesses- and Lords-in-Waiting
Councillors in Edinburgh
Diplomatic peers
Earls of Selkirk
First Lords of the Admiralty
High Commissioners of the United Kingdom to Singapore
Knights Grand Cross of the Order of St Michael and St George
Knights Grand Cross of the Order of the British Empire
Knights of the Thistle
Members of the Faculty of Advocates
Members of the Privy Council of the United Kingdom
Ministers in the Eden government, 1955–1957
Ministers in the Macmillan and Douglas-Home governments, 1957–1964
Ministers in the third Churchill government, 1951–1955
People from Wimborne Minster
Recipients of the Air Force Cross (United Kingdom)
Royal Air Force group captains
Scottish cricketers
Scottish representative peers
Unionist Party (Scotland) councillors
University of Bonn alumni
University of Paris alumni
University of Vienna alumni
Wiltshire cricketers
Douglas-Hamilton, George
People educated at Eton College